Emilie Sofia Bergbom (1834−1905) was a Finnish theater director. She was a supporter of the Fennoman movement.

She was joint director of the Finnish National Theatre with her brother Kaarlo Bergbom from its foundation in 1872 until her death in 1905. Bergbom was also director of a credit bank, making her the first of her sex in Finland to have an official position.

Sources
 Helmi Krohn: Emilie Bergbom – elämä ja työ. (K. F. Puromiehen kirjapaino O.-Y., 272 s.). Helsinki: Kustannusosakeyhtiö Otava, 1917.

1834 births
1905 deaths
19th-century Finnish businesswomen
19th-century Finnish businesspeople
Finnish theatre directors
19th-century theatre managers